Valley Lutheran High School is a private parochial school located in Saginaw Charter Township, Michigan. The school is owned and operated by the Lutheran Church–Missouri Synod. It was founded in 1977.

Sports
Valley Lutheran is a class "C" school. It did not have an American football team until the mid-1990s because of budget restrictions. As a result, the school was always well known for its soccer team and the annual homecoming dance was held in conjunction with a soccer match instead of the more traditional American football game.

The following sports are offered:

 Boys' soccer
 Girls' soccer
 American football
 Boys' cross country
 Girls' cross country
 Boys' basketball
 Girls' basketball
 Boys' wrestling
 Boys' bowling
 Girls' bowling
 Boys' baseball
 Boys' track
 Girls' track
 Boys' golf
 Girls' golf
 Girls' volleyball
 Cheerleading
 Pom poms
 Competitive pom poms
 Hockey
 Girls' softball

The "Carpet Dome"
Before 1995, the school's basketball court was carpeted and students dubbed the gymnasium the carpet dome. When the school was constructed, a decision had been made to cover the gymnaium in carpet for financial reasons as well as for noise reduction. Because of the school's religious background, there are daily chapel assemblies and it was thought that a carpet would be quieter than wooden flooring. In 1995, the carpeted basketball court sas replaced with more traditional wooden flooring. The Saginaw News frequently reported that the carpeted floor gave the home team a ten-point advantage and many carpet burns.

References

External links
 Valley Lutheran High School

Private high schools in Michigan
Educational institutions established in 1977
Lutheran schools in Michigan
Schools in Saginaw County, Michigan
1977 establishments in Michigan
Saginaw Intermediate School District
Secondary schools affiliated with the Lutheran Church–Missouri Synod